Xero Error, also known as Levity - Xero Error Minus1, is a computer generated science fiction film created and directed by Ashraf Ghori and starring Muhammad Ali Jamadar, Rhiannon Downie, Mouna Abbassy, Phat Mo, Nasser Chhipa, Nick Rego, Adnan Arif, and Aqeel Fikree. It was produced by Xpanse CGI. It is notable for being UAE's first CGI science fiction film. It was shown at the 63rd Cannes Film Festival.

Production
Production on Xero Error commenced in November 2009 and completed by March 2010 . Xero Error is UAE's first film produced using computer-generated imagery.  It is also the first film for production company Xpanse CGI, which has worked previously in commercial advertising.  In December 2008, Xpanse officials were in Houston, in attempts to raise the financing to cover the budget.

Although the budget needed for a feature-length version of the film was not raised, it was produced as an eight-minute short and completed independently at Xpanse CGI. Volunteers from social media channels were enlisted to complete the film. Actors were auditioned after a Twitter and Facebook campaign.

Release
The film had its world premiere at the 3rd Gulf Film Festival, April 2010 in Dubai UAE. It was also featured at the 63rd Festival de Cannes, the 10th edition of Sci-Fi-London and other international film festivals.

Following its release, Xpanse CGI were seeking investors to produce Xero Error for TV & film.

Awards and recognition 
 Digital Studio Awards 2011 — Winner, Best up and coming filmmaker 
 Digital Studio Awards 2011 — Runner-up, Animation of the Year
 Made in UAE Awards — Distinguished Achievement Award, 2011
 Gulf Film Festival, 2010 — Official Selection
 Festival de Cannes 2010 — Screening, Court Metrage
 Sci-Fi-London 2011 — Official Selection
 ICon festival 2011 — Official Selection
 SME Advisor Stars of Business Awards 2011 — Winner, Best Technology Implementation
 SME Advisor Stars of Business Awards 2011 — Winner, Industry Achievement for Events & Entertainment

Cast 

 XE7 - Muhammad Ali Jamadar
 ACYD - Rhiannon Downie
 In Raby - Phat Mo
 News Reporters
David George-Cosh
Mouna Abbassy
Nick Rego
Nasser Chhipa
Adnan Arif

 Sheikh Abdullah - Aqeel Fikree
 Video Caller - Mohammad Mondal

Crew 

 Written & Directed by - Ashraf Ghori
 Produced by - Xpanse CGI
 Executive Producer - Ashraf Ghori
 Associate Producers
Mohammad Mondal
Waqqas Qadir Sheikh

 Production Coordinator - Vonnie Maddox
 Post Production Supervisor - Tamas Tancos
 Motion Graphic Design - Nizam Mohammed
 Sound Design - Abdul Razzak Al Busmait ‘Q’
 Theme Music Composer - Abdul Razzak Al Busmait ‘Q’
 Sound Engineer - DJ Rav
 Audio Production - Tambi Studios
 Environment Design
Ashraf Ghori
Peter Steiner

 Character Rigging - Ahmed Shalaby
 Character Modeling -
Stanislav Klabik
Ashraf Ghori

 Character Animation
Ashraf Ghori
Jeen M. Thankappan
             
 Matte Painting
Shane Dale
Ashraf Ghori

 Rendered at
Xpanse CGI
Blackstone Studios

 Cameramen
Waqqas Qadir Sheikh
Ritesh Jeswani

 Editor
Waqqas Qadir Sheikh

References

External links
 
 
 Xpanse CGI website

Emirati_animation
Emirati_animated_films
2010 films
2010 animated films
2010s adventure films
2010s science fiction films
2010s English-language films